France A, also known as France XV and France B in the past, was the former name of the second national rugby union team of France behind the French national side.

In 2011 the French Rugby Federation designated the France U20 team as the second national side, and from the start of the 2017–18 season, the French Barbarians became the official second side, moving the role of the former France A team to the more prestigious invitational side with better name recognition.

History
France XV first played at the 1900 Summer Olympics, in Paris, when they defeated Germany by  score of 27-17, in the first ever Olympic Rugby Union Tournament. They later would play often matches for the Mediterranean Games or would represent France at the FIRA Trophy.

In 2009 they played in the IRB Nations Cup, against Italy A, Scotland A, Romania, Russia and Uruguay. The 2009 tournament was held in Romania.

2010 Churchill Cup Squad
26-man squad:

 Florian Fritz was replaced by Romain Cabannes.
 Benjamin Boyet was replaced by Jonathan Wisniewski.
 Grégory Lamboley was replaced by Damien Chouly.
 Nicolas Durand was replaced by Julien Tomas.

 Farid Sid was replaced by Julien Arias.
 Yann David was replaced by Yoan Audrin.
 Julien Tomas was replaced by Florian Cazenave.
 Lionel Mazars was replaced by Thibault Lacroix.

Honours
Churchill Plate: 2010

References

France A Results and line-ups (FFR)
2009 Nations Cup Squad
Official IRB Nations Cup Pages
List of France XV/B/A Official Matches

France national rugby union team
Second national rugby union teams